F85 or F-85 may refer to:
 BMW X5 (F85), mid-size luxury SUV based on the BMW X5 (F15)
 Durango F-85, an early personal computer 
 HMS Cumberland (F85), Batch 3 Type 22 frigate of the British Royal Navy
 HMS Jupiter (F85), J-class destroyer of the Royal Navy
 HMS Keppel (F85), anti-submarine frigate built for the Royal Navy in the 1950s
 HMS Montclare (F85), passenger ship built for the Canadian Pacific Steamship Company, Montreal
 Navarra (F85), a Spanish-built Santa Maria-class frigate of the Spanish Navy
 McDonnell XF-85 Goblin, an American experimental fighter aircraft
 Oldsmobile F-85, an American automobile
 Spanish frigate Navarra (F85), a Santa Maria-class frigate
 Volvo F85, a medium size truck